Palasisi, also named Mapahpan or Palassisi, is a Wayana village on an island in the Litani River. The village was founded by Wayanas who emigrated from Brazil.

Name 
Palasisi means "white man" in the Wayana language and is usually reserved for the French. Wapahpan means "place of the Wapa tree".

Geography 

Notes

References 

Indigenous villages in French Guiana
Islands of French Guiana
Maripasoula
Villages in French Guiana